Istanbul (F 515) is an  of the Turkish Navy.

Construction and career 
Istanbul was laid down on 19 January 2017 in which the ceremony was attended by Turkish Defence Minister Fikri Işık and senior military officers, including Admiral Bülent Bostanoğlu, Commander of the Turkish Naval Forces. She was launched on 23 January 2021 by Pendik Naval Shipyard in Istanbul. She is scheduled to be commissioned in 2023.

References 

2021 ships
Ships built at Istanbul Naval Shipyard
Frigates of the Turkish Navy